Essex is a provincial electoral district in southwestern, Ontario, Canada. It elects one member to the Legislative Assembly of Ontario.

It existed from 1867 to 1874 and was re-created in 1999 from Essex South, Essex—Kent and Windsor—Sandwich.

When the riding was recreated, it included all of Essex County except for Windsor, Old Tecumseh, St. Clair Beach, Leamington and Mersea Township.

In 2007, it lost the parts of Tecumseh that had since been amalgamated (South Sandwich Township).

Member of Provincial Parliament

This riding has elected the following members of the Legislative Assembly of Ontario:

Election results

1999-present

1867-1871

2007 electoral reform referendum

References

External links
Elections Ontario Past Election Results
Map of riding for 2018 election

Ontario provincial electoral districts
Essex, Ontario